Hainswa is a village in West Champaran district in the Indian state of Bihar.

Demographics
As of 2011 India census, Hainswa had a population of 1646 in 281 households. Males constitute 50.12% of the population and females 49.87%. Hainswa has an average literacy rate of 42.2%, lower than the national average of 74%: male literacy is 64.6%, and female literacy is 35.3%. In Hainswa, 24.42% of the population is under 6 years of age.

References

Villages in West Champaran district